Kirkcaldy Kestrels  are a Scottish ice hockey team that play in the Scottish National League. They play their games at Fife Ice Arena in Kirkcaldy.

Club roster 2020–21

2020/21 Outgoing

External links
 Kirkcaldy Kestrels official site

References
 Kirkcaldy Ice Hockey Club on Eurohockey.net

Ice hockey teams in Scotland

Sport in Fife
1984 establishments in Scotland
Ice hockey clubs established in 1984